Thomas A Wynn is an immunologist specializing in macrophage-mediated fibrosis in helminth infections.
 
He received a PhD in the department of microbiology and immunology at the University of Wisconsin-Madison Medical School He then did post-doctoral work with Dr. Alan Sher in the laboratory of parasitic diseases at the National Institute of Allergy and Infectious Diseases. He is now a senior investigator in NIAID.
 
Wynn is a fellow of the American Academy of Microbiology and has received the Oswaldo Cruz Medal of the Oswaldo Cruz Foundation and the Bailey K. Ashford Medal of the American Society of Tropical Medicine and Hygiene

Selected publications
His most cited paper is  According to Google Scholar, it has received 1960 citations as of March, 2016.

Other papers include."

References

External links
 Official webpage at NIH

American immunologists
Year of birth missing (living people)
Living people
Place of birth missing (living people)
 University of Wisconsin School of Medicine and Public Health alumni